Sandra Opdycke (born 16 October 1936) is an American historian.

Life 
She was born on 16 October 1936.

Career 
She specializes in the history of public health policy.

Her books have received mostly positive reviews.

Bibliography 
Some of her books are:

 The Routledge Historical Atlas of Women in America 
 Jane Addams and Her Vision of America 
 The Flu Epidemic of 1918: America's Experience in the Global Health Crisis  
 No One Was Turned Away: The Role of Public Hospitals in New York City Since 1900 
 America's Social Health: Putting Social Issues Back on the Public Agenda 
 American Social Welfare Policy: Reassessment and Reform

References

External links
 

21st-century American historians
1936 births
Living people